Michael Collins (1771 – 1832) was Roman Catholic Bishop of Cloyne and Ross. He was born in Rossmore, Co. Cork. He was educated for the priesthood at Maynooth College joining the Physics class in 1798, however he was expelled for his support and publicly encouraging insubordination, of the Robert Emmet Rising and completed his clerical studies at St. Patrick's College, Carlow. He became Professor of Belles Lettres in Carlow.

He served as a priest of Castletownroche, and then in Skibbereen, where he lived until his death.

In 1827 he became co-adjutor bishop of cloyne and ross and in 1830 Bishop of Cloyne and Ross.

He died in 1832 and in the Cathedral of St. Patrick, Skibbereen, Co. Cork, there is a marble monument of Dr Collins.

References

1771 births
1832 deaths
Alumni of Carlow College
Alumni of St Patrick's College, Maynooth
People from County Cork